The Hired Man is a 2013 novel by Aminatta Forna about an Englishwoman, Laura, and her two children who renovate a farmhouse in Croatia with the help of local handyman, Duro and the revealing of the recent history of the area.

Reception
The Guardian, in a review of The Hired Man, wrote "The novel is a continuation of Forna's overriding theme; the gradual accretion of small, seemingly insignificant acts of betrayal that eventually find expression in full-scale horror. In that respect, she remains committed to a single story; though The Hired Man triumphantly proves that the story need not always remain the same."

The Independent wrote "The pacing of this novel is stunning. After an edgy beginning, it blooms into joyousness halfway through when the mosaic is restored, and then the cruelty begins to flow." and The Boston Globe called it "fiercely mournful" concluding "Not since “Remains of the Day” has an author so skillfully revealed the way history’s layers are often invisible to all but its participants, who do what they must to survive. Skills acquired in war do, in fact, translate well to subsistence living. In this gorgeous novel, Aminatta Forna shows what doesn’t translate, however, and what makes war’s aftermath so long, melancholy, and deadly."

The Hired Man has also been reviewed by Booklist, BookPage Reviews, Library Journal, The Scotsman, The New Zealand Herald, the San Francisco Chronicle, the Star Tribune, The Vienna Review, The Hindu, and Kirkus Reviews.

References

External links
Library holdings of The Hired Man

2013 British novels
Novels set in Croatia
Bloomsbury Publishing books